The 2008–09 season was the 122nd season of competitive football by Hamilton Academical and the first back in the top-flight of Scottish football following promotion from the Scottish Football League at the end of the 2007–08 season.

Results and fixtures

Competitions

Scottish Premier League

League table

Scottish Cup

Hamilton Academical entered the Scottish Cup at the fourth round where they faced Ross County on 10 January 2009. After a 1–0 win courtesy of a goal from defender Chris Swailes, the club progressed to the quarter-finals and were drawn against Rangers at Ibrox. On 8 March 2009, the club were eliminated from the competition by eventual champion Rangers, following to a 5–1 defeat.

Scottish League Cup

The Accies entered the Scottish League Cup at the second round and were again knocked out in the same stage and by the same opponents as the Scottish Cup.

References

Hamilton Academical
Hamilton Academical F.C. seasons